Julius Epstein (7 August 1832 – 3 March 1926) was a Croatian-Jewish pianist.

Biography
Epstein was born in Zagreb, Croatia. He was married to Amalija (née Mautner) Epstein with whom he had a son Richard Epstein, a notable Zagreb pianist and music pedagogue.

Epstein was a pupil at Agram of the choir-director Vatroslav Lichtenegger, and in Vienna of Johann Rufinatscha (composition) and Anton Halm (pianoforte). He made his début in 1852, and soon became one of the most popular pianists and teachers in Vienna.

From 1867 to 1901, Epstein was a professor of piano at the Vienna Conservatory, where Ignaz Brüll, Marcella Sembrich, Mathilde Kralik, Gustav Mahler, Benito Bersa and Richard Robert were among his pupils.

Epstein edited Beethoven's piano sonatas, Mendelssohn's "Sämmtliche Klavierwerke" and Schubert's "Kritisch Durchgesehene Gesammtausgabe", among others.  He died, aged 93, in Vienna.

His two daughters Rudolfine Epstein (cellist) and Eugénie Epstein (violinist) went on a very successful concert tour through Germany and Austria during the 1876–1877 season. His son Richard Epstein was also a professor of piano at the Vienna Conservatorium. Epstein was a good friend of Johannes Brahms, Ferdo Livadić and mentor of Gustav Mahler.

In 1846 Epstein founded, together with his brothers Jakov (Jacques) and Vatroslav (Ignaz), the benefactor society "Društvo čovječnosti" Zagreb (Humanity society) which aided the poor and needy across the Kingdom of Croatia-Slavonia and the Kingdom of Dalmatia.

In 1902, Epstein received the Knight's Cross of the Order of Franz Joseph to commemorate his seventieth birthday.

References

 

Bibliography

External links 

1832 births
1926 deaths
Musicians from Zagreb
Austrian pianists
Croatian pianists
Austrian classical pianists
Male classical pianists
Croatian classical pianists
Austrian Jews
Croatian Jews
Austro-Hungarian Jews
Croatian Austro-Hungarians
Academic staff of the University of Music and Performing Arts Vienna
19th-century classical pianists
19th-century male musicians

Knights of the Order of Franz Joseph